The Diyarbakır oil field is an oil field located in Diyarbakır, Diyarbakır Province, Southeastern Anatolia Region. It was discovered in 2009 and developed by Türkiye Petrolleri Anonim Ortaklığı. It began production in 2009.

References

Oil fields in Turkey
Buildings and structures in Diyarbakır Province
Geography of Diyarbakır Province